= Jurgis Usinavičius =

Lithuanian journalist (born 1932)

Jurgis Usinavičius (real name Napalys Augulis; born 27 March 1932 in Pimpičkų rural area, Skapiškis district) – Lithuanian journalist, editor, publicist and writer.

== Biography ==
1959 Finished secondary agricultural school in Siauliai, Lithuania. In 1973 – studied in Lithuanian Academy of Agriculture. In 1945, his parents (Alfonsas Augulis and Kazimera) with all children had been deported to Komi. In 1947 he fled back to Lithuania under other person's name – Jurgis Usinavičius. Unlike his brother, Alfonsas Vytautas Augulis, Napalys stayed under different name during Soviet Union and stays nowadays. in 1991. In Siauliai Napalys finished secondary agricultural school in 1959 and Lithuanian Academy of Agriculture in 1973.

1959–1967 Worked in Siauliai district newspaper "Leninietis" (i.e., Leninist) as censorship clerk and head of agricultural department. 1967–1999 Worked in magazine Our Gardens ("Mūsų sodai"). Been head of editorial department, chief secretary, deputy chief editor.

He wrote more than 600 articles, reports, essays; mainly about agriculture and other public issues. During Soviet Union Era Napalys (under Jurgis Usinavicius name) freely maintained relationship with the rest of Augulis family and was a member of Communist Party. In independent Lithuania Jurgis indirectly took part in politics of Lithuania.

2015 Napalys (Jurgis) becomes president of Exiles and Emigrants Repatriation Fund "Vytis" (Tremtinių ir išeivių grįžimo į tėvynę fondas "Vytis", translated to English as chase, pursue). The fund is supposed to help return those Lithuanians who still live in Ural, Russia, and those who emigrated to work and live abroad in European Union, especially England.

== Bibliography ==
- Kuršėnų tarybinis ūkis (Kursenai Soviet economy), 1968
- I. Mičiurino vaismedžių medelynas (I. Michiurin's tree nursery), 1973
- Matau tavo vardą (I See Your ID), story. Vilnius: Aklųjų leidykla (Blinds publishing house), 1983
- Išskridusios bitės (Scattered Bees), novel about lost relatives and nationals. Vilnius: Žiedai, 1995
- Akmenėjantis angelas (Petrified Angel), novel. Vilnius: Žiedai, 1998
- Amžių dialogas (Dialogue of Ages), novel. Vilnius: Žiedai, 2001
- Karalių kaimas (Kings Village), novel. Vilnius: J. Usinavičius, 2004 ISBN 9955-592-75-3
- Likimai (Fates), historical novel. Vilnius: Žiedai, 2004 ISBN 9986-9062-3-7
- Vaikystės žvyrkeliai (Childhood Dirty [Gravel] Roads), romance novels for children. Vilnius: Spauda, 2006 ISBN 9955-665-68-8

== Rating ==
BELLADI competition winner: 1975 – Vilnius, 1977 – Tallinn, 1978 – Minsk.
